Rafael Esteve Vilella (1 July 1772, Valencia - 1 October 1847, Madrid) was a Spanish engraver in the Romantic style.

Biography 
He was born to a family of artists. His father was the sculptor, and his uncle was the painter, Agustín Esteve. He received his initial artistic instruction at the Real Academia de Bellas Artes de San Carlos, in Valencia, then moved to Madrid, where he continued his studies at the Real Academia de Bellas Artes de San Fernando. During the reign of King Charles IV, he collaborated with the Royal chalcographers. During the Peninsular War, he lived in Cádiz. Upon the war's completion, he was able to fulfill his desires to continue his education in France and Italy.

In 1839, he received the greatest honor of his career in the form of a gold medal at the Exposition des produits de l'industrie française, for his burin etching of Moses Striking Water from a Rock; after a painting by Bartolomé Murillo, the execution of which involved living in Seville for a time.

He was also awarded a cross in the Order of Charles III and named Honorary Director of the Academia de San Carlos. He was also an "Academic of Merit" at the Academia de San Fernando and a corresponding member of the Paris Academy.

Friendship With Francisco de Goya 
In 1799, he was named the Court Engraver and executed portraits of the Royal Family, based on drawings made by his uncle, Agustín, after paintings by Francisco de Goya; for the Guía de Forasteros (a type of almanac). This enabled him to begin a friendship with Goya, who painted his portrait in 1815. Though not one of Goya's best-known works, it has considerable value. A replica of the work was the most expensive thing sold on the online retailer, Amazon, in 2022. It was valued at about $4 million.

Esteve Vilella and Goya's friendship lasted despite the latter's exile from Spain (1824-1828) in his last years. In a letter to his son dated January 17, 1828, Goya signs with the postscript "«To Don Rafael Esteve a thousand thing, that I often remember."

References

Sources 
Gallego Gallego, Antonio (1968). Historia del grabado en España. Madrid: Cátedra. 
Zabala, Fernanda (2003). 125 valencianos en la Historia. Valencia (España): Carena Editors. 
Catalá Gorgues, Miguel Ángel et al. (1986) El grabador Rafael Esteve. 1772-1847, exhibition catalog, Valencia, Publicaciones de la Fundación Caja de Pensiones

External links 

Digitalized works @ the Biblioteca Digital Hispánica of the Biblioteca Nacional de España

1772 births
1847 deaths
Spanish engravers
Real Academia de Bellas Artes de San Fernando alumni
People from Valencia